The permanent members of the United Nations Security Council (also known as the Permanent Five, Big Five, or P5) are the five sovereign states to whom the UN Charter of 1945 grants a permanent seat on the UN Security Council: China, France, Russia, the United Kingdom, and the United States.

The permanent members were all Allies in World War II (and the victors of that war), and are  the five states with the first and most nuclear weapons. All have the power of veto which enables any one of them to prevent the adoption of any "substantive" draft Council resolution, regardless of its level of international support. The remaining 10 members of the UN Security Council are elected by the General Assembly, giving a total of 15 UN member states.

Permanent members 
The following is a table of the current permanent members of the United Nations Security Council.

History 

Based on the consensus on the Security Council's structure agreed upon at the 1944 Dumbarton Oaks Conference and subsequently at UN's founding in 1945, the five permanent members of the Security Council were the French Republic, the Republic of China, the Soviet Union, the United Kingdom, and the United States. There have been two seat changes since then, although these have not been reflected in Article 23 of the UN Charter, as it has not been accordingly amended:

 China's seat was originally held by the Nationalist government of the Republic of China (ROC). However, it lost the Chinese Civil War and retreated to the island of Taiwan in 1949. The Chinese Communist Party won control of Mainland China and established the People's Republic of China (PRC). In 1971, UN General Assembly Resolution 2758 recognised the PRC as the legal representative of China in the UN, and gave it the seat on the Security Council that had been held by the ROC, which was expelled from the UN altogether. Both the ROC and the PRC continue to claim de jure sovereignty over the entirety of China (including Taiwan). However, only 14 states continue to officially recognise the ROC as the sole legitimate government of China.
 After the dissolution of the Soviet Union in 1991, Russia was recognised as the legal successor state of the Soviet Union and maintained the latter's position on the Security Council.

Additionally, France reformed its provisional government into the French Fourth Republic in 1946 and later into the French Fifth Republic in 1958, both under the leadership of Charles de Gaulle. France maintained its seat as there was no change in its international status or recognition, although many of its overseas possessions eventually became independent.

The five permanent members of the Security Council were the victorious powers in World War II and have maintained the world's most powerful military forces ever since. They annually top the list of countries with the highest military expenditures along with India and Germany; in 2011, they spent over US$1 trillion combined on defence, accounting for over 60% of global military expenditures (the U.S. alone accounting for over 40%). They are also among the world's top 10 largest arms exporters and are the only nations officially recognised as "nuclear-weapon states" under the Treaty on the Non-Proliferation of Nuclear Weapons (NPT), though there are other states known or believed to be in possession of nuclear weapons.

Veto power 

The "power of veto" refers to the veto power wielded solely by the permanent members, enabling them to prevent the adoption of any "substantive" draft Council resolution, regardless of the level of international support for the draft. The veto does not apply to procedural votes, which is significant in that the Security Council's permanent membership can vote against a "procedural" draft resolution, without necessarily blocking its adoption by the council.

The veto is exercised when any permanent member—the so-called "P5" casts a "negative" vote on a "substantive" draft resolution. Abstention or absence from the vote by a permanent member does not prevent a draft resolution from being adopted.

Expansion 

There have been proposals suggesting the introduction of new permanent members. The candidates usually mentioned are Brazil, Germany, India, and Japan. They compose the group of four countries known as the G4 nations, which mutually support one another's bids for permanent seats.

This sort of reform has traditionally been opposed by the Uniting for Consensus group, which is composed primarily of nations that are regional rivals and economic competitors of the G4. The group is composed of Italy and Spain (opposing Germany), Mexico and Argentina (opposing Brazil), Pakistan (opposing India), and South Korea (opposing Japan), in addition to Canada, Malta and Turkey.  Since 1992, Italy and other council members have instead proposed semi-permanent seats or expanding the number of temporary seats.

Most of the leading candidates for permanent membership are regularly elected onto the Security Council by their respective groups. Japan was elected for eleven two-year terms, Brazil for ten terms, and Germany for three terms. India has been elected to the council eight times in total, with the most recent successful bid being in 2020.

In 2013, the P5 and G4 members of the UN Security Council accounted for eight of the world's ten largest defence budgets, according to the Stockholm International Peace Research Institute (SIPRI).

Leaders of the permanent members 
The following are the heads of state or heads of government that represent the permanent members of the UN Security Council :

Historical leaders

See also 
 List of country groupings

Notes

References

Further reading 
 Nico J. Schrijver and Niels M. Blokker (eds.). 2020. Elected Members of the Security Council: Lame Ducks or Key Players? Brill.com.
  This is referred to by some as the "Italian Model".

United Nations Security Council
International security
China and the United Nations
France and the United Nations
Russia and the United Nations
United Kingdom and the United Nations
United States and the United Nations